Stolička's or Stoliczka's mountain vole (Alticola stoliczkanus) is a species of rodent in the family Cricetidae.
It is found in China, Pakistan, India and Nepal.

References

Alticola
Mammals of Asia
Mammals of Nepal
Mammals of Pakistan
Mammals described in 1875
Taxonomy articles created by Polbot